Setten is a lake that lies in Setskog in Aurskog-Høland municipality in Akershus. The lake lies in typical forest terrain. The lake has many bays and small islands, and is a popular canoeing, fishing and camping area. The lake is part of the Haldenvassdraget, and empties into Mjermen.

The fishing in Setten consists of northern pike, European perch, common roach, common bleak and burbot.

Setten was part of the large canal system that ran from Eidskog via the Soot Canal, to Mjermen and later to the lake at Haldensvassdraget. The Soot Canal has its start at Setten with Tangen in the north and later down by boat to Kolstad in the south.

Lakes of Viken (county)
Aurskog-Høland